Schwarzach am Main is a market town and municipality in the district of Kitzingen in Bavaria in Germany. It lies on the river Main.

References

Kitzingen (district)